The Santa Monica Stakes is an American Grade II Thoroughbred horse race run annually in late January/early February at Santa Anita Park in Arcadia, California. Open to fillies and mares age four and older, it is run on the dirt over a distance of seven furlongs. Until 2010, the race name was the Santa Monica Handicap.

Inaugurated in 1957, through 1959 it was open to horses three-year-olds and up of either sex.

The race was run in two divisions in 1961 and 1965.

It was rated as GII in 1973–1983, GIII in 1984–1987, GII in 1988 and 1989, GI in 1990–2012, and GII in 2013 and later.

Records
Speed record:
 1:20.60 – Past Forgetting (1982) (dirt)

Most wins:
 Chop House (1964, 1965)
 Past Forgetting (1982, 1983)
 Pine Tree Lane (1987, 1988)
 Merneith (2021, 2022)

Most wins by a jockey:
 6 – Bill Shoemaker (1961 (2×), 1963, 1980, 1982, 1985)

Most wins by a trainer:
 7 – Bob Baffert (2006, 2007, 2010, 2019, 2021, 2022, 2023)

Most wins by an owner:
 3 – C. V. Whitney (1959, 1960, 1961)
 3 – William Haggin Perry (1965, 1966, 1969)
 3 – Bernard J. Ridder (1978, 1982, 1983)

Winners

References

 The 2008 Santa Monica Handicap at the NTRA
 Ten Things You Should Know: Santa Monica Stakes

Horse races in California
Santa Anita Park
Flat horse races for four-year-old fillies
Sprint category horse races for fillies and mares
Graded stakes races in the United States
Recurring sporting events established in 1957
1957 establishments in California